Since 1985 the International Soling Association (ISA) keeps record of the annual International Soling Ranking. A few years the ranking list of the IYRU/ISAF was used. After the 2000 Olympics the system was changed to an individual ranking system so that the trophy can be won by one or more individual crewmembers, regardless the role of the crewmember, or by one or more teams. The winner receives the Soling World Trophy.

References

Soling competitions